Dagmar Ringe (born February 20, 1942) is an American biochemist, educator, and researcher. She is the Harold and Bernice Davis Professor in Aging and Neurodegenerative Disease at Brandeis University in Waltham, Massachusetts and holds appointments in the departments of Chemistry and Biochemistry.

Education
Ringe received the Bachelor's degree in Chemistry from Barnard College in New York, New York in 1963. She earned the doctoral degree in Chemistry under the direction of George Hein at Boston University in Boston, Massachusetts in 1969.

Academic career
Following postdoctoral research appointments at the Fakultat der Universitat Munchen in Munich, Germany and at the Massachusetts Institute of Technology (MIT) in Cambridge, Massachusetts, she became Instructor and Senior Lecturer in the Department of Chemistry at MIT. She joined the faculty at Brandeis University in 1990 as Lucille P. Markey Associate Professor, promoted to Lucille P. Markey Professor in 1994.  She became the Harold and Bernice Davis Professor in Aging and Neurodegenerative Disease at Brandeis University in 2006.

Service to the discipline
Ringe served as Co-Chair of the Gordon Research Conference on Enzymes, Co-enzymes and Metabolic Pathways in 1994 and was a member of the Board of Trustees of the Gordon Research Conferences (2000-2006). She was a Program Officer for the Program in Biophysics, Molecular and Cellular Biosciences, Division of Biology at the National Science Foundation (NSF) in 1997, 2000-2001 and 2010-2011 and served as Deputy Division Director, Molecular and Cellular Biosciences, Division of Biology, NSF, from 2012-2014. She was an Associate Editor of the Biophysical Journal (1999-2006) and is an editorial Board member of the Protein Journal and Scientific Reports. She served as an advisor for the TV mini-series documentary, The Mystery of Matter: Search for the Elements.

Contributions to science
Ringe has made extensive contributions to understanding the structure and function of enzymes. Her recent work has centered on understanding the functions of proteins associated with neurodegenerative diseases, including Alzheimer's, Lou Gehrig's, and Parkinson's. She co-authored a 2015 study revealing a potential novel approach to the treatment of Parkinson's disease and identified new pathways in Parkinson's. She has also discovered potential new drugs to stop the protein aggregation that leads to Alzheimer's disease.

Honors
 Biophysical Society Margaret Oakley Dayhoff Award (1985)
 Guggenheim Fellowship of the John Simon Guggenheim Memorial Foundation (1997)
 Fellow of the American Association for the Advancement of Science (since 2005)
 Abram L. Sachar Medallion from Brandeis University (2006)
 Alexander von Humboldt Forshingspreis (2006)

Books
 Reactions and Syntheses in the Organic Chemistry Laboratory, L.F. Tietze and Th. Eichler, translated by Dagmar Ringe, University Science Books, Mill Valley, CA, 1989.
 Primers in Biology:  Protein Structure and Function, Gregory A. Petsko and Dagmar Ringe,  New Science Ltd.,  London,  2004
 Cooperative Stewardship, National Research Council Report,  J.J. Wise, Chair, 1999
 "Bridges to Independence: Fostering the Independence of New Investigators in Biomedical Research."  National Research Council Report, 2005
 Bridging the Sciences, Report of the Interagency Coordinating Committee, Nov 9, 2004, NIH/NIBIB, NSF.
 Drug Design: Structure- and Ligand-Based Approaches, K.M.Merz, D. Ringe, C.H.Reynolds, eds. Cambridge University Press (2010).

References

External links
Brandeis University Faculty
Dagmar Ringe, Ph.D., Michael J. Fox Foundation grantee
Chemistry Faculty Brandeis University
Potential Alzheimer's Drug Spurs Protein Recycling

1942 births
Living people
American women chemists
American women biochemists
Barnard College alumni
21st-century American women